Camponotus fayfaensis is a species of carpenter ant (genus Camponotus) found in coastal regions of Yemen, Saudi Arabia, and the UAE.

References

fayfaensis
Hymenoptera of Asia
Insects described in 1985